Peter Tyndall is the  Ombudsman, Information Commissioner, and Commissioner for Environmental Information of Ireland. As Ombudsman, he is ex-officio member of four important statutory oversight bodies: the Commission for Public Service Appointments, the Referendum Commission, the Constituency Commission and the Standards in Public Office Commission.

He received his warrant of appointment from President Michael D. Higgins at a ceremony in Áras an Uachtaráin on 2 December 2013. He is the successor to Emily O'Reilly.

As Ombudsman Peter Tyndall has published a number of reports including:

'A Good Death'  (June 2014): a report into end of care life in Irish hospitals.

'Learning to Get Better'  (May 2015): an investigation into how public hospitals handle complaints

'Taking Stock'  (July 2017): an investigation into complaint handling and issues identified in complaints made about the Child and Family Agency (Tusla).

The reports made a number of recommendations which are being implemented.  Follow-up reports to 'Learning to Get Better' and 'A Good Death'  were published in 2018.

Opportunity Lost  (November 2017) was an investigation into the administration of the Magdalen Restorative Justice Scheme ( a redress scheme for women who worked in Irish Magdalene laundries).  The report was critical of how the Department of Justice and Equality administered the scheme.  The Ombudsman's recommendations were initially rejected by the department. However, in April 2018 the Minister of Justice and Equality, and the Irish Taoiseach (Prime Minister) announced that there would be full implementation of the Ombudsman's recommendations.

In November 2016 Peter Tyndall was elected President of the International Ombudsman Institute at the 11th IOI World Conference in Bangkok.

Tyndall is a Dubliner who has lived in Wales for more than 30 years where he occupied a variety of senior positions in housing and social care. He has also been Head of Education and Culture for the Welsh Local Government Association, Chief Executive of the Arts Council of Wales, and latterly the Public Services Ombudsman for Wales from 2008 to 2013. He was Chairman of the British and Irish Ombudsman Association for two years, and is a member of the World and European Boards of the International Ombudsman Institute.

Tyndall has an M.Sc. degree in Strategic Management from Cardiff University and is married with three daughters.

References 

Year of birth missing (living people)
Living people
Alumni of Cardiff University
Ombudsmen in the Republic of Ireland
Ombudsmen in Wales